Beere is an English surname. Notable people with this name include:

 Tom Beere (born 1995), English footballer
 Lucy Beere (born 1982), Guernsey international lawn and indoor bowler
 Thekla Beere (1902–1991), Irish civil servant
 Jackie Beere, English educator
 Estelle Beere (1875–1959), New Zealand dancing teacher
 Richard Beere (before 1493–1524), English Benedictine abbot of Glastonbury,
 Mrs. Bernard Beere (1851–1915), English actress

Other
 Beere baiting
 Beere Wala Jattan

See also 
 Beer (disambiguation)
 Bere (disambiguation)

English-language surnames